Los Andes is a Panama Metro station on Line 1. It was one of the first 11 stations when the metro was opened on 5 October 2014 and began operations on the following day. It is an elevated station. The station is located between Pan de Azúcar and San Isidro. It remained the northern terminus of Line 1 until 15 August 2015, when the line was extended north to San Isidro.

Los Andes station is located in San Miguelito District, at the intersection of Highway 3 and Avenida de Los Andes.

References

Panama Metro stations
2014 establishments in Panama
Railway stations opened in 2014